Benjamin Schmideg (born 12 June 1986) is an Australian actor born in Victoria.

Filmography

Films 
 Take Away – as Kynan (2002)

TV series 
 Wicked Science – as Russell Skinner (First season: 2004; Second season: 2005–2006)
 Blue Heelers (appeared in one episode only; Of Middle Eastern Appearance – as Rufus Sedgwick – 2002)
 Short Cuts (appeared in one episode only; Wonder Twins Activate – as Mickey – 2002)
 Stingers (appeared in two episodes; The Whisper Room – as Redhead Skater – 2001; Blow Off – as Daniel – 2002)
 Neighbours (appeared in one episode only; Episode 3555 – as Martin – 2000)
 High Flyers – as JJ (1999)

Other works 

Schmideg appeared in some productions of: Bugsy Malone, A Midsummer Night's Dream, Friends Forever and Marat/Sade.

References 
 

1986 births
Australian male film actors
Australian male child actors
Australian male soap opera actors
People from Victoria (Australia)
Living people
Australian people of Dutch descent